Ahmad Sadegh-Bonab is an Iranian politician. He was for a short time the acting Minister of Roads and Transportation after Ahmad Khorram, the former Minister was impeached by the Majlis on October 3, 2004.

Before the post of the supervisor of the ministry, Sadegh-Bonab has been a Vice Minister of Roads and Transportation and the Iranian Ambassador to Ukraine.

References 

Iranian Vice Ministers
Ambassadors of Iran to Ukraine
Living people
Government ministers of Iran
Year of birth missing (living people)